Lyme Handley is a civil parish in Cheshire East, England. It contains 32 buildings that are recorded in the National Heritage List for England as designated listed buildings. Of these, one is listed at Grade I, the highest grade, three are listed at Grade II*, the middle grade, and the others are at Grade II. The major building in the parish is the mansion of Lyme Park. Its estate, which contains a number of listed buildings, occupies much of the parish. The parish is entirely rural, and most of the other listed buildings are farmhouses or farm buildings. In addition the list includes two bridges, an ancient standing stone, and a milestone.

Key

Buildings

See also

Listed buildings in Disley
Listed buildings in Kettleshulme
Listed buildings in Pott Shrigley
Listed buildings in Poynton with Worth
Listed buildings in Stockport
Listed buildings in Whaley Bridge

References
Citations

Sources

 

 

Listed buildings in the Borough of Cheshire East
Lists of listed buildings in Cheshire